The 2012 Challenger of Dallas was a professional tennis tournament played on hard courts. It was the 14th edition of the tournament which was part of the 2012 ATP Challenger Tour. It took place in Dallas, United States between 6 and 12 February 2012.

Singles main-draw entrants

Seeds

 1 Rankings are as of January 30, 2012.

Other entrants
The following players received wildcards into the singles main draw:
  Brian Baker
  Jack Sock
  Sam Querrey
  Rhyne Williams

The following players received entry from the qualifying draw:
  Carsten Ball
  Chris Eaton
  Vladimir Obradović
  Clément Reix

Champions

Singles

 Jesse Levine def.  Steve Darcis, 6–4, 6–4

Doubles

 Chris Eaton /  Dominic Inglot def.  Nicholas Monroe /  Jack Sock, 6–7(6–8), 6–4, [19–17]

External links
Official Website 
ITF Search
ATP official site

Challenger of Dallas
Challenger of Dallas
Challenger of Dallas
Challenger of Dallas
Challenger of Dallas